The following outline is provided as an overview of and topical guide to computer vision:

Computer vision – interdisciplinary field that deals with how computers can be made to gain high-level understanding from digital images or videos. From the perspective of engineering, it seeks to automate tasks that the human visual system can do. Computer vision tasks include methods for acquiring digital images (through image sensors), image processing, and image analysis, to reach an understanding of digital images. In general, it deals with the extraction of high-dimensional data from the real world in order to produce numerical or symbolic information that the computer can interpret. The image data can take many forms, such as video sequences, views from multiple cameras, or multi-dimensional data from a medical scanner. As a technological discipline, computer vision seeks to apply its theories and models for the construction of computer vision systems. As a scientific discipline, computer vision is concerned with the theory behind artificial systems that extract information from images.

Branches of computer vision 

 Computer stereo vision
 Underwater computer vision

History of computer vision 

History of computer vision

Computer vision subsystems

Image enhancement 
 Image denoising
 Image histogram
 Inpainting
 Histogram equalization
 Tone mapping
 Retinex
 Gamma correction
 Anisotropic diffusion (Perona–Malik equation)

Transformations 
 Affine transform
 Homography (computer vision)
 Hough transform
 Radon transform
 Walsh–Hadamard transform

Filtering, Fourier and wavelet transforms and image compression 
 Image compression
 Filter bank
 Gabor filter
 JPEG 2000
 Adaptive filtering

Color vision 
 Visual perception
 Human visual system model
 Color matching function
 Color space
 Color appearance model
 Color management system
 Color mapping
 Color model
 Color profile

Feature extraction 
 Active contour
 Blob detection
 Canny edge detector
 Contour detection
 Edge detection
 Edge linking
 Harris Corner Detector
 Histogram of oriented gradients (HOG)
 Random sample consensus (RANSAC)
 Scale-invariant feature transform (SIFT)

Pose estimation 
 Bundle adjustment
 Articulated body pose estimation (BoPoE)
 Direct linear transformation (DLT)
 Epipolar geometry
 Fundamental matrix
 Pinhole camera model
 Projective geometry
 Trifocal tensor

Registration 
 Active appearance model (AAM)
 Cross-correlation
 Geometric hashing
 Graph cut segmentation
 Least squares estimation
 Image pyramid
 Image segmentation
 Level-set method
 Markov random fields
 Medial axis
 Motion field
 Motion vector
 Multispectral imaging
 Normalized cut segmentation
 Optical flow
 Particle filtering
 Scale space

Visual recognition 
 Object recognition
 Scale-invariant feature transform (SIFT)
 Gesture recognition
 Bag-of-words model in computer vision
 Kadir–Brady saliency detector
 Eigenface

Commercial computer vision systems 

 5DX
 Aphelion (software)
 Microsoft PixelSense
 Poseidon drowning detection system
 Visage SDK

Applications 

 3D reconstruction from multiple images
 Audio-visual speech recognition
 Augmented reality
 Augmented reality-assisted surgery
 Automated optical inspection
 Automatic image annotation
 Automatic number plate recognition
 Automatic target recognition
 Check weigher
 Closed-circuit television
 Computer stereo vision
 Contextual image classification
 DARPA LAGR Program
 Digital video fingerprinting
 Document mosaicing
 Facial recognition systems
 GazoPa
 Geometric feature learning
 Gesture recognition
 Image collection exploration
 Image retrieval
 Content-based image retrieval
 Reverse image search
 Image-based modeling and rendering
 Integrated mail processing
 Iris recognition
 Machine vision
 Mobile mapping
 Navigation system components for:
 Autonomous cars
 Mobile robots
 Object detection
 Optical braille recognition
 Optical character recognition
 Intelligent character recognition
 Pedestrian detection
 People counter
 Physical computing
 Red light camera
 Remote sensing
 Smart camera
 Traffic enforcement camera
 Traffic sign recognition
 Vehicle infrastructure integration
 Velocity Moments
 Video content analysis
 View synthesis
 Visual sensor network
 Visual Word
 Water remote sensing

Computer vision companies 

 3DFLOW
 Automatix
 Clarifai
 Cognex Corporation
 Datagen
 Diffbot
 IBM
 InspecVision
 Isra Vision
 Kinesense
 Mobileye
 Scantron Corporation
 Teledyne DALSA
 VIEW Engineering
 Zivid
 Warden Machinery

Computer vision publications 

 Electronic Letters on Computer Vision and Image Analysis
 International Journal of Computer Vision

Computer vision organizations 

 Conference on Computer Vision and Pattern Recognition
 European Conference on Computer Vision
 International Conference on Computer Vision
 International Conferences in Central Europe on Computer Graphics, Visualization and Computer Vision

Persons influential in computer vision

See also 
 Outline of artificial intelligence
 Outline of robotics
 List of computer graphics and descriptive geometry topics
 Virtual Design and Construction

References

External links 

 USC Iris computer vision conference list
 Computer vision papers on the web A complete list of papers of the most relevant computer vision conferences.
 Computer Vision Online News, source code, datasets and job offers related to computer vision.
 Keith Price's Annotated Computer Vision Bibliography
 CVonline Bob Fisher's Compendium of Computer Vision.
 British Machine Vision Association Supporting computer vision research within the UK via the BMVC and MIUA conferences, Annals of the BMVA (open-source journal), BMVA Summer School and one-day meetings

 
Computer vision topics
Computer vision
Computer vision